New Zealand's Next Top Model, Season 1 is the original season of New Zealand's Next Top Model which is a reality TV show based on America's Next Top Model. Thirteen young women compete for the title and a chance to start their career in the modeling industry. The catchphrase for this season is "Our Turn To Turn Heads".

The prize for this season was a contract with 62 Model Management, a 1-year contract with CoverGirl cosmetics, an 8-page editorial in CLEO Magazine, an all expenses paid trip to Sydney to meet with Ursula Hufnagl of Chic Model Management and a trip to New York to meet with NEXT Model Management.

The international destinations for this season were Sydney, Australia, where the final seven judging panel was held, and then Los Angeles, United States for one episode with six contestants.

The winner was 16-year-old Christobelle Grierson-Ryrie from Auckland, New Zealand. She is the first winner of the New Zealand’s Next Top Model.

This season has aired on TV3 in New Zealand and FOX8 in Australia.

Contestants 
(ages stated are at start of contest)

Episode summaries

Episode 1: (Casting) 
Original Airdate: 13 March 2009

The 33 semi-finalists were told to pack their bags and go to Queenstown, New Zealand via home video. Immediately, they meet model and judge Colin Mathura Jeffree, who introduced them to Angela Dunn. The girls strut on an impromptu runway. Some girls impress and some failed to deliver.
The semi finalists meet the judges and it was revealed that Sarah, had left her daughter at home and recently overcame a morphine addiction; Laura, who won a chilli eating competition; Ajoh, who was a refugee from Africa and revealed how hard her life has been; Christobelle who at 16 is the youngest contestant, Olivia and Lucy, two sisters who are competing for the top prize against each other, the hyper-competitive Hosanna; Frankie, who has a blonde 'fro and a killer walk and Rhiannon, who at 16 already looks like a supermodel.

Tensions rise between Teryl-Leigh and Hosanna because of Hosanna's over competitiveness and not having made time to make friends; which leaves Hosanna emotional.

The next day, all 33 girls head to the lake for a photo shoot in swimsuits. All girls are impressed, especially Sarah who arrived late because she was sick. Later 33 girls are cut down to 20 remaining finalists.
These 20 finalists then get cut down to 13 finalists, who moved into the top model house in Auckland.

Featured Photographer: Monty Adams
Special Guest: Angela Dunn

Episode 2: The Girls Fly High 
Original Airdate: 20 March 2009

The girls arrive in Auckland and go to their clifftop mansion only to find the door is locked. The magic password was "Sara". The girls were surprised to find a strippers pole in the main bedroom. The girls then do their first ever challenge at a wind tunnel with Colin. The girls have to pose in 60 km wind. Olivia, Ajoh, Ruby and Christobelle did well but Sarah impressed Colin the most with her unique poses. The girls then did another challenge, putting together a model look at a Max Store in five minutes. The winner will get an exclusive Max Merino Ad Campaign shown all over New Zealand. Teryl-Leigh comes out as the winner with her classic, professional yet high fashion look. She selects Ajoh and Sarah to share her prize.

The girls went to their first photo shoot, which is an homage to a New Zealand aviation great, Jean Batten. The girls had to embody a 1930s aviatrix on a plane.
Christobelle, Teryl-Leigh, Laura, Ruby and Ajoh impressed while Rhiannon, Hosanna and Tiffany struggled.

At judging, the prizes include an 8-page editorial spread in Cleo, a CoverGirl cosmetics contract, and New Zealand representation with Sara's own agency, 62 Models. The prize also includes a trip to Sydney and New York to meet with top agencies there. The judges love Teryl-Leigh's photo because of her strength and confidence, Christobelle is praised for her variety of poses and the judges believe Laura has the most potential to be the most versatile. Tiffany struggled as the photographer said "it looked like she was working a strippers pole..."
Teryl-Leigh gets the first call out; Hosanna and Tiffany end up in the bottom two. Hosanna's dedication is coming across as desperation and Tiffany's attitude is just too much. 
Hosanna is given a second chance and Tiffany was the first girl eliminated.

First Call-Out: Teryl-Leigh Bourke
Bottom Two: Hosanna Horsfall & Tiffany Butler
Eliminated: Tiffany Butler
Featured Photographer: Jackie Meiring
Special Guest: Stacy Gregg (Editor-at-Large of New Zealand's Fashion Quarterly magazine)

Episode 3: The Girls Take The Streets 
Original Airdate: 27 March 2009

The remaining 12 girls survive their first elimination, with Lucy realising that this is a competition and there will only be one winner. Rebecca-Rose moans about her poor performance. Sarah and Rebecca-Rose blame the photographer for her bad photo. Teryl-Leigh reveals sarcastically, that she would have been sad if Hosanna was sent home.
The girls then arrive at a hip hop studio and gets a lesson from hip hop dance group, Urban Beat. All the girls feel uncomfortable and awkward especially Sarah who leaves and refuses to participate. Laura impressed Colin for her effort and participation.

The girls' partake in a rooftop-hip hop inspired runway show in front of Colin and guest judge Angela Dunn. Christobelle, Teryl-Leigh and Sarah were praised for their performance and following the brief of the challenge, which was to strike three hip hop poses at the end of the runway, while the rest got carried away and danced on the runway.
Unfortunately owning the attitude meant missing the brief and Teryl-Leigh's subtle poses took home the prize.
Back at the house, a misunderstanding occurred between Teryl-Leigh and Ajoh about race and the shower-time Teryl-Leigh has.

The girls go to SnowPlanet for their photo shoot to test their stamina and ability to translate their personality into a photograph.
Laura, Rhiannon, Rebecca-Rose, Christobelle and Hosanna impressed the photographer while Ruby's attitude at the photoshoot was questioned. Olivia struggled while Sarah refused to do the photoshoot because of a headache.

At panel, Hosanna impresses; Ruby gets reamed for her attitude; the judges are split about Laura; Lucy could have been better; Victoria's nerves held her back but her photo scored; Rhiannon's legs take her from cheesy to hot; Olivia bores; Ajoh's photo is called a disaster and the judges loved Christobelle & Rebecca Rose's editorial photos. The judges deliberate, and in the end, Sarah and Olivia end up in the bottom two but Sarah's unreliability sends her home, despite her limitless potential.

First Call-Out: Christobelle Grierson-Ryrie
Bottom Two: Olivia Murphy & Sarah Yearbury
Eliminated: Sarah Yearbury
Featured Photographer: Craig Owen
Special Guests: Angela Dunn and Urban Beat Dancers

Episode 4: The Girls Get Transformed 
Original Airdate: 3 April 2009

The girls receive their makeovers at a Newmarket Salon. Christobelle complains that her platinum blonde weave looks grey, Lucy cries over her hair being dyed brown, something she's not used to, and Ajoh and Laura have a hard time getting used to their new short pixie cuts.

The challenge takes the girls to Kelly Tarlton's Underwater World where they have to showcase Australian fashion designer Kirrily Johnson's latest designs. Teryl-Leigh tells the designer she doesn't know what she's wearing, offending her and Laura describes her outfit as comfortable, making Colin laugh at her unprofessionalism.

At the photoshoot, the girls are turned into underwater creatures and pose in a beauty shot. Chris is impressed with most of the girls who embrace their new looks well but is disappointed with Olivia, Teryl-Leigh and Rhiannon.

During judging, the judges praise Rebecca-Rose's picture and are also impressed by Laura, Ruby, Hosanna, Victoria, Christobelle Lucy and Rhiannon, even though her film was bad. Ajoh was praised for her runway but the judges were concerned that her photos were not as strong as they could be. In the end, Olivia and Teryl-Leigh end up in the bottom two, but Teryl-Leigh is spared and Olivia is sent home for her weak photos and inability to showcase her beauty on set.

First Call-Out: Rebecca-Rose Harvey
Bottom Two: Olivia Murphy & Teryl-Leigh Bourke
Eliminated: Olivia Murphy
Featured Photographer: Hannah Richards
Special Guests: Kirrily Johnston and Paul Serville

Episode 5: The Girls Pose in Haute Couture 
Original Airdate: 10 April 2009

The show opens with the girls recalling the elimination. Lucy's struck by the fact she's truly in this competition alone now and Teryl-Leigh realizes she can't keep coasting and needs to step it up if she wants to stay in the competition.

Sara stops by the house for a visit and a game of "most potential/least potential". Christobelle and Ajoh turn out to be early favorites, as lots of girls pick them to be in the top two. Teryl-Leigh turns out to be everyone's favorite to go, which really surprises her.

The challenge this week was the requisite five-minute make-up challenge, which is always good for a bit of fun. The judges get a kick out of some of the girls' make-up, and declare Ruby the winner, despite her being so tired and not really into the challenge on the way over. Her prize is a make-up that's not in stores and a one-on-one session with a professional make-up artist.

The shoot is the girls' first high fashion shoot. It's on a beach in West New Zealand and they have to battle the wind and sand as well as bring it in a difficult garment.

On the shoot, Ruby is okay; Ajoh impresses, but gets the one-look criticism again; Victoria tried too hard; Rhiannon was stiff; the photographer really struggled with Lucy; Christobelle was the photographer's favorite; Teryl-Leigh didn't bring enough in her eyes; Laura was effortlessly graceful; Hosanna surprised and Rebecca-Rose did well. Overall, the photographer was surprised and pleased with everyone.

At panel, the judges are impressed with Christobelle, Hosanna, and Ajoh; are mixed about Laura, Teryl-Leigh, Rebecca Rose, Victoria and Ruby; and are disappointed with Lucy & Rhiannon. In the end, Ajoh's improvement put her on top and Victoria and Rhiannon are on the bottom. The judges send Rhiannon home, as she just isn't ready to be a top model yet.

First Call-Out: Ajoh Chol
Bottom Two: Rhiannon Lawrence & Victoria Williams
Eliminated: Rhiannon Lawrence
Featured Photographer: Karen Inderbitzen-Waller
Special Guests: Stefan Knight and Chris Kennedy-Grant

Episode 6: The Girls Are Diamonds in the Rough 
Original Airdate: 17 April 2009

The remaining girls are tested on their poise and grace when they are asked to pose on gymnastic items. Most of the girls don't do very well except for Christobelle, Hosannah, Victoria and Laura who excel with their creativity and grace. Ajoh refused to do the lesson because she claimed that in her culture it is not okay for girls to open up their legs wide apart.
At the end of the challenge, the winner is revealed to be Laura.

For this week's photoshoot, the girls are asked to do a commercial photo for Michael Hill Jeweller in a car and wearing a Michael Hill watch. Most of the girls do okay while Teryl-Leigh, Victoria & Laura excel. Christobelle, Rebecca-Rose and Ajoh are singled out for performing poorly at the photoshoot and receive negative feedback from Chris and the photographer.

At the judging panel, the judges praise Laura's shot as well as Teryl-Leigh & Victoria and says Lucy's shot looks like a mannequin. In the end, Rebecca-Rose and Ajoh land in the bottom two, which shocks Sara as they were both front-runners in the competition. Rebecca-Rose for not being a commercial girl and Ajoh for not performing at the challenge. However, Rebecca-Rose is spared and Ajoh is sent home.

First Call-Out: Laura Scaife
Bottom Two: Ajoh Chol & Rebecca-Rose Harvey
Eliminated: Ajoh Chol
Featured Photographer: Jackie Meiring
Special Guest: Ngahuia Williams, Makaia Carr and Pieter Stewart

Episode 7: Cycle One Rewind (Recap) 
Original Airdate: 24 April 2009

A recap on the first season of the show, looking over the journey's each of the 8 contestants remaining have been through to make it this far into the competition including never before seen confessions, secrets and arguments that happened in the first 6 weeks of the competition.

Episode 8: The Girls Get Dirty 
Original Airdate: 1 May 2009

The girls took part in a music video for the New Zealand band Autozamm.  Dancing and acting was required of them.  They first wore 1960's style dresses, then circus costumes.  Rebecca-Rose was told to wear a leopard costume and Teryl-Leigh, a gorilla costume.  Victoria was the leading lady who got to kiss one of the musicians at the end of the video.

The girls also practiced their VJ skills on the set of C4 with Jermaine Leef of the show Select.  Ruby won the competition and her prize was to be a VJ on Monday with Jermaine.

The photoshoot was with boys from the Cleo Bachelor of the Year competition.

At panel, Christobelle, Ruby, and Laura are praised for their photos while Laura and Hosanna's clips get praised. However, the rest of the girls (Rebecca-Rose, Lucy, Teryl-Leigh, and Victoria) get highly criticised for their photos and clips in the music video. Rebecca-Rose and Lucy end up in the bottom two, Rebecca-Rose for not living up to her high fashion potential and Lucy for her almost too commercial appeal, and Lucy is ultimately saved and Rebecca-Rose, one of the former front runners, is sent home.

First Call-Out: Laura Scaife
Bottom Two: Lucy Murphy & Rebecca-Rose Harvey
Eliminated: Rebecca-Rose Harvey
Featured Photographer: Russ Flatt
Special Guests: Ed Davis, AutoZaam, Shelley Ferguson, Jaquie Brown and Jermaine Leef

Episode 9: The Girls Go Down Under 
Original Airdate: 8 May 2009

Each girl was paired with a student designer, whose task it was to create an outfit out of secondhand clothes that, altogether, came to less than $40.  The girls then modelled their outfit down a catwalk.  Christobelle's was avant garde.  Teryl-Leigh was not impressed with hers.  There were two winners of the challenge for this week: Ruby and Christobelle.  They were treated to a spa.

For their photoshoot, this week the girls were asked to portray an emotion.  The emotion was to replace the often-seen cigarette that featured in photos and in film in the circa 1950s era.

The girls went overseas - to Sydney, Australia - for their elimination.  Here they were told that Australia was merely a pit-stop; the remaining girls would travel on to Los Angeles.  Most of the Girls Photo's were praised especially Ruby, Laura & Victoria but Lucy had the weakest photo. Lucy and Hosanna were in the bottom two.  The wink which Hosanna gave at the end of her catwalk did not go down well with Sara and she was called out for being too fake.  Lucy's photo was given negative feedback and the judges wondered if her photos were on plateau.  Lucy was eliminated in the end.

First Call-Out: Ruby Higgins
Bottom Two: Hosanna Horsfall & Lucy Murphy
Eliminated: Lucy Murphy
Featured Photographer: Craig Owen
Special Guests: Abby, Scott, Celine , April, Jeremy, Ivana, Priyanka and Morgan McGlone

Episode 10: The Girls Hit The Runway To L.A 
Original Airdate: 15 May 2009

The 6 remaining girls arrive in L.A and go sight seeing; they then go to the L.A Division of NEXT Model Management to meet with manager, Alexis Borges. He gives the girls advice - Hosanna is too short for the agency hence they would not accept her; Victoria is considered ordinary; Teryl-Leigh and Ruby need to lose weight if they want a high fashion career; Christobelle is wearing too much makeup and Laura is to work on her posture. At breakfast the next morning, Teryl-Leigh makes a healthy choice and eats wedges instead of chips.

The girls then arrive at Los Angeles Fashion District. They have US$75 and thirty minutes to buy an entire outfit. Laura, Hosanna and Ruby showed an effortless outfit as a professional model. Teryl-Leigh is criticized for picking an unflattering outfit. Christobelle and Victoria were late and disqualified. Teryl-Leigh, Christobelle and Victoria have to spend time in a fish tank at their hotel for 3 hours, while making it look like fashion.
The challenge this week was a CoverGirl commercial advertising TruBlend Makeup Collection. Ruby and Christobelle really embodied a true and believable CoverGirl; Teryl-Leigh was once again told that she was uninspiring and depressing; Laura impressed the Cover Girl client; Hosanna was criticized for being crazy and frighteningly scary and Victoria for being monotone and lifeless despite looking like a cover girl. Christobelle won the challenge and picked Ruby and Teryl-Leigh to share her prize to go on more sight seeing at night in L.A.

The photoshoot is an alluring, mysterious high fashion shoot under the Santa Monica Pier. The girls are surprised and overwhelmed that their photographer is Nigel Barker. Nigel makes the girls nervous but he inspired the girls to impress and do well. Christobelle, Laura and Victoria are praised for their performance; Teryl-Leigh was battered for being sad and uninspiring; Ruby didn't deliver up to a high standard and Nigel said that Hosanna was crazy and righteous.

At panel, Hosanna breaks down because her craziness and over-exaggerated poses dampened both the photoshoot and the commercial, although she did still have a great photo. Victoria produces an amazing photo and Nigel commented that she has a face that can work on an international level. Laura and Christobelle impress the judges and especially Nigel Barker. Teryl-Leigh's photo was depressing and sad and Ruby just had a mediocre photo that didn't do her body justice.
Christobelle was called first and Teryl-Leigh and Hosanna land in the bottom two and Teryl-Leigh is eliminated much to the girls' surprise. As Teryl-Leigh leaves the elimination room, Hosanna is smirking and happy that Teryl-Leigh got eliminated before her.

First Call-Out: Christobelle Grierson-Ryrie
Bottom Two: Hosanna Horsfall & Teryl-Leigh Bourke
Eliminated: Teryl-Leigh Bourke
Commercial Director: Michael Mihail
Featured Photographer: Nigel Barker
Special Guests: Chris Kennedy-Grant and Alexis Borges

Episode 11: The Girls Go See The City 
Original Airdate: 22 May 2009

The 5 girls return from Los Angeles and tension rises as the girls are surprised and puzzled at Hosanna making it this far.
The girls then meet with Colin and New Zealand model, Nikki Phillips at Vodafone, where they find out they are doing go sees. The girls meet with New Zealand's top designers such as Huffer, Trelise Cooper and Zambesi. Christobelle falls at her first go see with Trelise Cooper and is criticized once again for wearing too much makeup. Victoria is criticized for looking too commercial, Ruby failed to impress at the go sees and it was thought that she didn't look like a model. Laura excels in her go sees and Hosanna seems to be to short but impresses with her energetic personality. Laura, Christobelle, Hosanna and Ruby made it back in time but Victoria turns up an hour late and is disqualified. Hosanna wins the challenge and Laura is shocked because she thought she was going to win.

The girls' photoshoot was inspired by 80's Glamour Elite Socialites on Michael Hill's very impressive yacht. Chris Sisarich finally photographs the final 5. Christobelle, Ruby and Hosanna really captured the idea and impressed while Laura fails and Victoria over-thought her poses which disappointed Chris.

Back at the top model house, the girls felt the pressure of the competition and Christobelle, Laura, Victoria and Ruby are realizing that Hosanna is competition and that she might be the under dog of the competition. The girls threw Victoria into the pool head first which started a playful fight. Hosanna then joined the others in the hot tub and the mood changed dramatically.

At panel, Hosanna and Christobelle are praised for their photographs while Laura is said to have had a bad week. Hosanna gets first call out; Ruby and Victoria lands in the bottom two, Victoria because she didn't embody the personality for the photoshoot and not getting booked for any go sees. And Ruby, because the judges felt that she was cruising through the competition and then disappointed at go sees. Ultimately, Victoria is sent home because of her inconsistency.

First Call-Out: Hosanna Horsfall
Bottom Two: Ruby Higgins & Victoria Williams
Eliminated: Victoria Williams
Featured Photographer: Chris Sisarich
Special Guests: Nikki Phillips, Trelise Cooper, Anna Fitzpatrick, Murray Bevan, Marissa Findlay, Dan Buckley, Yvonne Benetti, Steve Dunstan and Atip

Episode 12: The Girls Get Ready To Rumble 
Original Airdate: 29 May 2009

The girls are blown away by Victoria's grace and class and Hosanna uses this opportunity to trash everyone else in her confessional.

The girls get a chance to meet Wendell, a former gossip columnist. She interviews them and asks tough questions - like about Laura's DUI, Hosanna's sports star past, Christobelle's attitude and Ruby's weight- then gives them feedback as to how they could have dealt with that better. All the girls bore her but she capitalizes on Laura's DUI and Ruby's story about nearly killing Victoria to make great tabloid better.

After that, the girls think they are getting a special treat at a spa. But there's a surprise twist because after the pampering, the girls learn they need to become spokesmodels for one of the products that was just used on them. Hosanna and Laura just ramble on throughout the commercial. Ruby is okay, but her delivery is flat. Christobelle was her usual sparkly self and she is declared the winner. As her prize, she receives a year's supply of Nivea products and an advertorial in Women's Day.

This week's photo shoot was boxing themed and the girls took turns in the ring. At panel, the photos are all praised. Chris says that Laura self destructing, same with their criticisms for Ruby, whose weight is seen as a problem. In the end, Laura's stunning photo puts her called first. Hosanna is second and the bottom two are Christobelle - for her weak photo - and Ruby - for her weight. In the end, Christobelle's stronger overall performance keeps her in the competition.

First Call-Out: Laura Scaife
Bottom Two: Christobelle Grierson-Ryrie & Ruby Higgins
Eliminated: Ruby Higgins
Featured Photographer: Craig Owen
Special Guests: Wendell Nissen, Merilyn Havler, Atip and Monty Betham

Episode 13: The Girl Who Becomes New Zealand's Next Top Model 
Original Airdate: 5 June 2009

The final three do three different photoshoots each for Cleo Magazine. The winner's shots will appear in an 8-page editorial in Cleo Magazine after the show ends. Chris and Colin are both impressed with all the girls and how much they've grown since the start of the competition.

At the first judging, the girls are asked to tell the judges who they think should win and who should go, all the girls said they should win, both Laura and Christobelle singled out Hosanna as the one that should leave and Hosanna told the judges that Laura should be sent home. In the end, it is Hosanna who is sent home and Christobelle and Laura are the final two.

First Call-Out: Christobelle Grierson-Ryrie
Bottom Two: Hosanna Horsfall & Laura Scaife
Eliminated: Hosanna Horsfall
Featured Photographer: Monty Adams

The final two do a runway show in front of some of the best of the industry and are surprised to see some of the eliminated contestants who will walk the runway with them. During the runway, Laura does a small slip but recovers well and is complimented by the judges on this.

The judges look over both girls portfolio's and overall improvement before the girls come back into the judging room and Christobelle is announced as New Zealand's Next Top Model.

Special Guests: Shelley Ferguson, Trelise Cooper
Featured Models in Fashion Show: Sarah Yearbury, Ajoh Chol, Rebecca-Rose Harvey, Lucy Murphy, Teryl Leigh Bourke, Ruby Higgins and Hosanna Horsfall
Designer: Mix of NZ/International Designers
Final Two: Christobelle Grierson-Ryrie & Laura Scaife
New Zealand's Next Top Model: Christobelle Grierson-Ryrie

Call-out order 

 The contestant won the challenge
 The contestant was eliminated
 The contestant won the competition

 In episode 1, the pool of 20 girls was reduced to 13 who moved on to the main competition. However, this first call-out does not reflect their performance that first week.
 Episode 7 is the recap episode

Average  call-out order
Final two is not included.

Bottom two

 The contestant was eliminated after her first time in the bottom two
 The contestant was eliminated after her second time in the bottom two
 The contestant was eliminated after their fourth time in the bottom two
 The contestant was placed as the runner-up in the final judging

Photo Shoot Guide 
 Episode 1 Photoshoot (Casting): Swimsuit in/by Lake
 Episode 2 Photoshoot: Jean Batten inspired Aviatrixes
 Episode 3 Photoshoot: Snow Editorial
 Episode 4 Photoshoot: Fantasy Beauty Shots
 Episode 5 Photoshoot: Haute Couture on Beach
 Episode 6 Photoshoot: Michael Hill Wristwatches in Car
 Episode 8 Music Video and Photoshoot: Autozamm Music Video / Sensual Pin Up Girls with Cleo magazine Bachelors
 Episode 9 Photoshoot: 30's Glamour Inspired Portraying Emotions
 Episode 10 Commercial & Photoshoot: CoverGirl TruBlend Foundation / Alluring High Fashion under Piers at Santa Monica Beach
 Episode 11 Photoshoot: 80's Inspired Elite Girls on a Yacht (Inspired by Calvin Klein S/S 09 Ad Campaigns)
 Episode 12 Commercial & Photoshoot: Nivea Visage Beauty / Boxing Shoot
 Episode 13 Photoshoot & Runway Show: Cleo magazine Editorial / New Zealand Fashion Designer Collaboration

Makeovers 
Ajoh: Cut short
Christobelle: Gisele Bündchen inspired blonde highlights
Hosanna: Layered and dyed chocolate brown ala Eva Mendes
Laura: Agyness Deyn inspired cut and dyed platinum blonde
Lucy: Shoulder length cut and dyed chocolate brown
Olivia: Trimmed and dyed platinum blonde
Rebecca Rose: Shoulder length cut and dyed red
Rhiannon: Shoulder length cut and dyed dark brown
Ruby: Trimmed and dyed blonde
Teryl-Leigh: Cut shorter and dyed copper red
Victoria: Katie Holmes inspired layered bob cut and dyed dark brown

Post-show careers

Ajoh Chol is signed with Izaio Models in Berlin and has been featured in various magazine editorials and walked in several fashion shows for Berlin Fashion Week. Ajoh has been featured on the vogue.it site for the Coast + Weber + Ahaus look book.
Christobelle Grierson-Ryrie for winning the show, she has been signed with 62 Models, has shot her editorial for Cleo magazine and got a 1-year contract with CoverGirl. She met with Chic Model Management in Sydney and Next Models in New York. She has done runway shows for Yvonne Benneti and Trelise Cooper. She has been on many ads as well.
Hosanna Horsfall is signed with N Model Management and 62 Models. She has done runway shows for Yvonne Benneti and Trelise Cooper. She has also done print work for Good Vibrations 2010 merchandise and Ed Hardy.
Laura Scaife is signed with 62 Models and has done a lot of commercial and print work. She has done runway shows for Trelise Cooper, Cybele, Baquesse and more.
Lucy Murphy is signed with Section Zero Model Management. She has done print work for Zaibatsu Hair Expo 2010 and photos with Tim Watson. She has done runway work for GetFunkd awards 2009.
Olivia Murphy is signed with Section Zero Model Management. She has done a few test shots and shot for the MGK 2010 Spring Collection and has done runway work for GetFunkd awards 2009.
Rebecca-Rose Harvey was previously signed with August Models. She has done print work for Sera Lilly and runway work for her. She has done runway work for Adrian Hailwood and Lara Parker. She has done photos with Karolina Trawinska and Ayla Brie as well. Now, she is no longer modelling.
Rhiannon Lawrence has done photos taken with Harlow Halliday and has been in print work for Tess's Design. She has also done print work for The Marlborough Express.
Ruby Higgins is signed with 62 Models and is well known for her Postie Plus ads. She has been on the cover of Sunday Magazine and has been a host at the VNZMA'S. She has been featured in ads for inpulse and for "Smoking Not our future".
Sarah Yearbury has done some work for Max Shop. 
Teryl-Leigh Felicia Bourke was previously signed with Clyne Model Management and has been in print work for Max Shop. She has done photography with other photographers also.
Tiffany Butler did not modelling after the show.
Victoria Williams is signed with 62 Models. She has done print work for M2 Magazine, Annah Stretton and Salon Business. She has been on what now on "Da Apprentice" and has done runway work for Sable and Minx.

External links 
 

2009 New Zealand television seasons
Top Model